Woodrow Wilson Williams (August 21, 1912 – February 24, 1995) was a Major League Baseball second baseman who played for the Brooklyn Dodgers and Cincinnati Reds from 1938 to 1945.  In 1949, he was the manager of the Poughkeepsie Chiefs in the Colonial League.

External links

1912 births
1995 deaths
Brooklyn Dodgers players
Major League Baseball second basemen
Cincinnati Reds players
Baseball players from Virginia
Minor league baseball managers
Leaksville-Draper-Spray Triplets players
Dayton Ducks players
Allentown Brooks players
Louisville Colonels (minor league) players
Elmira Pioneers players
Nashville Vols players
Syracuse Chiefs players
Hollywood Stars players
Indianapolis Indians players
St. Hyacinthe Saints players
People from Pamplin, Virginia